"Ninety-Nine Out of a Hundred (Want To Be Loved)" is a song recorded by Rudy Vallee in 1931. It was written by Tin Pan Alley tunesmiths, Al Sherman and Al Lewis. In the 1960s it was re-recorded by Bob Crosby and his orchestra for Capitol Records.

Songs written by Al Sherman
Songs written by Al Lewis (lyricist)
1931 songs